Karl Ruß (4 August 1779, Vienna - 19 September 1843, Vienna) was an Austrian painter in the Biedermeier style.

Life and work 
He was born to a poor family. When they moved to Neustadt, he began to display some artistic talent, and received lessons from local artists. They returned to Vienna in 1793, and he was able to enroll at the Academy of Fine Arts, Vienna. He initially studied flower painting with Johann Baptist Drechsler, then landscapes with Johann Christian Brand. Following Brand's death, in 1795, he switched to history painting, with Hubert Maurer as his instructor. After graduation, he made his living painting portraits and working for booksellers. He also studied etching and copper engraving.

He was married in 1806 and, thanks to some recently acquired patronage, was hired to work on decorative paintings at the Albertina. In addition, he executed wall paintings for Count Johann Philipp Staadion and decorative work for Duke Albert Casimir, as well as being part of a group that worked for the Empress Consort, Maria Ludovika of Austria-Este. Despite this success, the loss of a pension, which he had been planning to use for studies in Italy, caused his financial situation to become unstable and he had to return to portrait painting.

Thanks to a recommendation from the landscape painter, Christoph Heinrich Kniep, he was introduced to Archduke John of Austria, who was looking for a "Kammermaler" (Chamber Painter). Ruß was engaged and accompanied him on hikes throughout Styria; making sketches and finding motifs for his favorite types of art. His most important commission involved a series of watercolors, depicting the native costumes of that region; from the bourgeoisie to the peasants. These works preserve all that is authentically known about their clothing for the period of 1810 to 1820. Later, the folklorist, included many of Ruß' images in his definitive book on Styrian costumery (Steirisches Trachtenbuch, 1932).

From 1821, he served as the first Custodian of the Picture Gallery at Belvedere Palace, a position that he held for three years. Once again, he was able to find patrons, including some in France, and had a busy career, with a constant stream of commissions. In 1843, he fell ill with "dropsy of the chest" and died a short time later, aged sixty-four.

His son, Leander, was also a painter. A street in Vienna's Hietzing district was named after them in 1927.

Sources 
 Eduard Melly: Karl Russ. Umriss eines Künstlerlebens, Vienna 1844 (Full text).

External links 

 More works by Ruß @ ArtNet

1779 births
1843 deaths
Austrian painters
Austrian portrait painters
History painters
Academy of Fine Arts Vienna alumni
Deaths from edema
Artists from Vienna